Olly Kohn (born 19 March 1981, in Bristol) is a Wales international rugby union player for Harlequins having previously played for Bristol and Plymouth Albion.

A lock forward, Kohn won the English Premiership with Harlequins in 2011-12, starting in the final against Leicester Tigers.

Kohn was forced to retire at the end of the 2012/2013 season due to injury.

International
In January 2013 Kohn announced that he was eligible to play for Wales as his grandfather was from the Rhymney Valley. On 25 January 2013 Kohn was called up to the Wales squad for the 2013 Six Nations Championship. Kohn made his international debut for Wales in their first match of the 2013 Six Nations Championship against Ireland at the Millennium Stadium, Cardiff on 2 February 2013 as a second-half replacement.

External links
Harlequins Profile
Aviva Premiership Profile
Wales profile

References

1981 births
Wales international rugby union players
Welsh rugby union players
Harlequin F.C. players
Living people
Rugby union players from Bristol
Plymouth Albion R.F.C. players
Rugby union locks
Clifton RFC players